Absolute Evil – Final Exit is a drama film written and directed by Ulli Lommel. The film stars Carolyn Neff, Rusty Joiner and David Carradine. The film premiered at the Berlin International Film Festival on 8 February 2009.

Premise 
Lovers Savannah (Carolyn Neff) and Cooper (Rusty Joiner) share a childhood trauma. But just as they seem to have conquered their inner demons, the past catches up on them, and they are soon pursued by enigmatic gang leader Raf (David Carradine) and his plans of retaliation and murder.

Cast

Premiere 
The film was accepted to Berlin International Film Festival and saw its premiere in February 2009. The film was shown in the Panorama section.

The Hollywood Reporter published an online review of Absolute Evil, in which Peter Brunette wrote: "At least once every festival, critics collectively scratch their heads and say "How did THAT get selected?" Absolute Evil is the tentative awardee for worst film at this year's Berlinale. Shot in an ugly digital format (not HD) that is often out of focus, the stock thriller structure also sports horribly clichéd, repetitive dialogue, dramatic "gestures" that we've seen a thousand times, and very bad performances (with the exception of David Carradine, who seems to be having the time of his life). Commercial prospects, aside from a few DVD buyers who might be seeking campy entertainment, seem quite remote."

Trilogy 
Absolute Evil – Final Exit is the first part of the trilogy that will continue with Absolute Evil – Life After Death and Absolute Evil – Back from the Dead.

References

External links 
 screendaily.com review
 
 Filmportal.de

2009 films
2009 crime drama films
American crime drama films
American crime thriller films
2000s English-language films
English-language German films
Films directed by Ulli Lommel
American independent films
German crime thriller films
German crime drama films
German independent films
2009 independent films
2000s American films
2000s German films